Crijević is a Croatian surname. Notable people with the surname include:
 
Ilija Crijević (1463–1520), Croatian poet
Serafin Crijević (1696–1759), Croatian author
 House of Crijević, Ragusan noble family

Croatian surnames